"Behind the Wheel" is a song by English electronic music band Depeche Mode from their sixth studio album, Music for the Masses (1987). It was released on 28 December 1987 as the album's third single, reaching number 21 in the United Kingdom, number six in Switzerland and number six in West Germany.

Route 66 
A cover version of the Bobby Troup song "(Get Your Kicks on) Route 66" features on the single as a B-side. Martin Gore states that he chose the song because he "thought it would be a good idea to record a driving song on the B-side of 'Behind the Wheel'". It was remixed by the Beatmasters and was made up from elements of "Behind the Wheel".

Reception 
Cash Box called it a "dark, European funk tune for those who dance with a touch of sadness" that is "verry strange, yet appealing."

In 1989, the single was ranked number 30 on Spin magazine's list of "The 100 Greatest Singles of All Time".

Track listings

"Behind the Wheel" was written by Martin L. Gore. "Route 66" was written by Robert William Troup Jr.

7": Mute / 7Bong15 (UK) 
 "Behind the Wheel" (remix) – 4:03
 "Route 66" – 4:11

12": Mute / 12Bong15 (UK) 
 "Behind the Wheel" (Shep Pettibone mix) – 5:56
 "Route 66" (Beatmasters mix) – 6:19

12": Mute / L12Bong15 (UK) 
 "Behind the Wheel" (Beatmasters mix) – 8:00
 "Route 66" (Casualty mix) – 10:40 (remixed by Dave Allen)

CD: Mute / CDBong15 (UK) 
 "Behind the Wheel" (7" remix) – 4:03
 "Route 66" – 4:11
 "Behind the Wheel" (Shep Pettibone mix) – 5:56
 "Behind the Wheel" (LP mix) – 5:19

CD: Mute / CDBong15 (UK) 
 "Behind the Wheel" (remix) – 4:03
 "Route 66" – 4:11
 "Behind the Wheel" (Shep Pettibone mix) – 5:56
 "Route 66" (Beatmasters mix) – 6:19
 "Behind the Wheel" (Beatmasters mix) – 8:00
 "Route 66" (Casualty mix) – 10:40
 "Behind the Wheel" (LP mix) – 5:19
The second CD is the 1992 re-release.

Cassette maxi-single: Mute / CBong15 (UK) 
 "Behind the Wheel" (Shep Pettibone mix) – 5:56
 "Route 66" (Beatmasters mix) – 6:19
 "Behind the Wheel" (LP mix) – 5:19

7": Sire / 7-27991 (US) 
 "Behind the Wheel" (remix) – 4:03
 "Route 66/Behind the Wheel" (mega-single mix) – 4:13 (remixed by Ivan Ivan)

12": Sire / 0-20858 (US) 
 "Behind the Wheel/Route 66" (megamix) – 7:48 (remixed by Ivan Ivan)
 "Behind the Wheel/Route 66" (megadub) – 6:10 (remixed by Ivan Ivan)
 "Behind the Wheel" (extended remix) – 5:56
 "Behind the Wheel" (Beatmasters mix) – 8:00

12": Sire / PRO-A-2952 (US promo) 
 "Behind the Wheel" (extended remix) – 5:56
 "Behind the Wheel" (dub) – 5:53 
 "Behind the Wheel" (Beatmasters mix) – 8:00
 "Behind the Wheel" (7" DJ remix) – 3:48

CD: Sire / PRO-CD-2953 (US promo) 
 "Behind the Wheel" (remix) – 4:03
 "Behind the Wheel/Route 66" (mega-single mix) – 4:29 (remixed by Ivan Ivan)
 "Route 66/Behind the Wheel" (mega-single mix) – 4:12
 "Behind the Wheel/Route 66" (Megamix) – 7:48 (remixed by Ivan Ivan)
 "Behind the Wheel" (Beatmasters mix) – 8:00
 "Behind the Wheel" (extended remix) – 5:56

Music video
The music video was directed by Anton Corbijn and included on the Strange compilation.  Shot entirely in black and white, the video depicts Dave Gahan's car from the Never Let Me Down Again video being towed away while he waits on crutches, only to discard those crutches as he rides on the back of a Vespa SS180 driven by a female companion to a local southwestern village, where the rest of the band play the song while Gahan and the woman dance.

The video features the 7" remix of the song, although an alternative video also exists set to the original album version.

Charts

Weekly charts

Year-end charts

"Behind the Wheel 2011"

"Behind the Wheel 2011" (Reprise / Rhino / Mute PRCD-400205) is a US-only promotional CD single, released in 2011. The title track is a remix made by former Depeche Mode member Vince Clarke for the band's Remixes 2: 81–11 album. The single was promotional only, and not for sale. It reached number three on the Billboard Hot Dance Club Play chart in 2011.

Track listing
"Behind the Wheel 2011" (Vince Clarke extended vocal) – 6:42
"Behind the Wheel 2011" (Mark Picchiotti re–edited Vince Clarke dub) – 6:44
"Behind the Wheel 2011" (Mark Picchiotti re-edited Vince Clarke radio mix) – 3:36

External links
 Single information from the official Depeche Mode website
 AllMusic review

References

1987 singles
1987 songs
Black-and-white music videos
Depeche Mode songs
Music videos directed by Anton Corbijn
Mute Records singles
Songs written by Martin Gore
UK Independent Singles Chart number-one singles
Songs about cars